Patrick Mago (born 4 December 1994) is a professional rugby league footballer who plays as a  for the Wigan Warriors in the SL. 

He previously played for the South Sydney Rabbitohs, North Queensland Cowboys and the Brisbane Broncos in the National Rugby League.

Background
Mago was born in Otara, New Zealand, and is of Samoan descent and moved to Australia at a young age. He grew up in Logan City, Queensland and attended Marsden State High School.

He played his junior football for the Souths Logan Magpies before signing with the Canberra Raiders.

Playing career

Early career
In 2012, Mago moved to Canberra and played for Canberra SG Ball Cup side. In 2013, he moved up to their NYC side. At the end of that season he represented the Junior Kangaroos, scoring twice in the side's 38-26 win over the Junior Kiwis. 

In 2014, Mago captained the Raiders' NYC side and was chosen to represent the Queensland under-20 and Junior Kangaroos sides.

In 2015, Mago moved into Canberra's NRL squad, but spent the season playing for their feeder club, Mounties, in the New South Wales Cup. After being released at the end of the season, Mago spent the 2016 pre-season with North Queensland on a train and trial contract and eventually earned a two-year NRL contract with the club. He spent the season playing for the North Queensland feeder club, the Mackay Cutters in the Queensland Cup.

2017
After starting the season with the Northern Pride, Mago made his first grade debut for North Queensland in their Round 23 game against Penrith. In October, he signed with the Cowboys' Queensland rivals, the Brisbane Broncos.

2018
Mago made 12 appearances for Brisbane in the 2018 NRL season including the club's elimination final loss against St. George at Suncorp Stadium.

2019 & 2020
After making no appearances in the 2019 NRL season for Brisbane, Mago joined South Sydney and made 12 appearances for the club in the 2020 NRL season.

2021
On 15 July 2021, it was reported that he had signed for Wigan in the Super League on a three-year deal for the 2022 season.

Statistics

NRL
 Statistics are correct to the end of the 2017 season

References

External links
South Sydney Rabbitohs profile
Brisbane Broncos profile
North Queensland Cowboys profile

1994 births
Living people
Australian sportspeople of Samoan descent
Australian expatriate sportspeople in England
Australian people of New Zealand descent
Australian rugby league players
Brisbane Broncos players
Mackay Cutters players
North Queensland Cowboys players
Northern Pride RLFC players
Rugby league second-rows
South Sydney Rabbitohs players
Rugby league players from Auckland
Wigan Warriors players
New Zealand expatriate sportspeople in England